

Serpentine Airfield  is located at the Hopeland, Western Australia.

The airfield is operated by the Sport Aircraft Builders Club of Western Australia.  the club has about 350 members, 100 hangars and approximately 135 aircraft including many rare and unique examples.

Gallery

See also
 List of airports in Western Australia

References

External links
 

 Sport Aircraft Builders Club of Western Australia
 Airservices Aerodromes & Procedure Charts

Airports in Western Australia
Airports established in 1975